Thomas Waldron Sumner (1768–1849) was an architect and government representative in Boston, Massachusetts, in the early 19th century. He designed East India Marine Hall and the Independent Congregational Church in Salem; and the South Congregational Society church in Boston. He was also involved with the Exchange Coffee House, Boston.

In Boston he lived on Cambridge Street and Chamber Street, and later moved to Brookline. He belonged to the Boston Associated Housewrights Society and the Massachusetts Charitable Mechanick Association. Sumner married Elizabeth Hubbard (1770–1839); children included Caroline Sumner (born 1796) and Thomas Hubbard Sumner. His parents were engineer James Sumner (1740–1814) and Alice Waldron (died 1773). The artist John Christian Rauschner created portraits of Sumner and his wife.

Images

References

Further reading

 

1768 births
1849 deaths
Architects from Boston
19th century in Boston
People from Brookline, Massachusetts